Zenith SA is a Swiss luxury watchmaker. The company was started in 1865 by Georges Favre-Jacot in Le Locle in the canton of Neuchâtel and is one of the oldest continuously operating watchmakers. Favre-Jacot invented the concept of "in house movements", believing that only through control of the entire watchmaking process, could perfection be achieved. Zenith was purchased by LVMH in November 1999, becoming one of several brands in its watch and jewellery division which includes TAG Heuer and Hublot and is currently run by Julien Tornare as President and CEO.

History
In 1865, at the age of 22, George Farve-Jacot begin manufacturing watches under his name at a small workshops in Le Locle, Switzerland. After witnessing the success of American watch companies Waltham and Elgin utilizing mass production to sell affordable and reliable timepieces, he invested heavily in his own company to create a vertically-integrated watchmaking operation, becoming the first manufacture d'horlogerie. At the 1900 Paris World's Fair, George Farve-Jacot & Co. was awarded the Grand Prix for their "Zenith" movement, so named because Farve-Jacot believed it represented the best of precision timekeeping. In 1911, the company was renamed after the prized movement.

To further support vertical integration of watch manufacturing, Zenith purchased movement maker Martel in 1959. Through the acquisition, and at the direction of Zenith leadership, the company began work on an automatic chronograph movement, and in 1969 was the first to announce their achievement with the El Primero movement.

Due to ongoing naming disputes with the Zenith Radio Company, the company was unable to achieve a sizable market share in the United States. In 1968, Zenith merged with Movado (and later Mondia as Movado-Zenith-Mondia) to sell in the United States under the already established Movado brand. With the popularity of quartz watches increasing, Zenith Radio Company decided to enter the market in 1972 through acquisition of Zenith, joining the two companies of the same name. It was during this ownership that production of mechanical movements was halted and the production shifted to quartz movements, a move meant to save the company, but ultimately led to it being put up for sale in 1978.

Dixi, who already had purchased many struggling Swiss watchmakers, purchased Movado-Zenith-Mondia from Zenith Radio Company in 1978 under the leadership of Paul Castella. While the other brands under the consortium slowly shuttered production due to the Quartz Crisis, Zenith was continuing to produce wristwatches as it struggled to survive. As automatic movements began to come back into demand, Ebel (and later Rolex) sourced the El Primero movement for their own chronograph timepieces, which breathed new life into the struggling brand. In 1999, as watch consortiums (led by Swatch Group) began to acquire brands, LVMH purchased Zenith for $48.4 million USD, which continues to be a part of the luxury goods conglomerate today.

George Favre-Jacot 
George Favre-Bulls was born 1843. At the age of nine he stopped attending school to pursue an apprenticeship in watchmaking, and by the age of 13 had already established his own business. He married Louise-Philippine Jacot-Descombes at the age of 20, and was known from that point on as George Favre-Jacot. He died in 1917 at the age of 74.

Favre-Jacot at some time requested that a house be built for himself at Le Locle, by the architect Le Corbusier. He was also closely involved with another prominent architect, named Alphonse Laverrière. His relationship with this latter architect was the source of influence upon the Werkbund movement. The two men collaborated with a shared artistic vision of the nature of production, to the extent to which they themselves somewhat reformed the artistic situation within francophone Switzerland at the time.

Chronometry 
At the 1900 Paris Universal Exhibition, Zenith won its first award for chronometry and in honor of that award, the manufacturer released the Grand Prix Paris 1900 pocket watch which featured a depiction of the prize on the case. In the 1920s, Zenith developed the Calibre 26x series of chronometers based on an 8-day car clock, which were used for both marine and observatory competitions. In the 1940s, Zenith continued their efforts to develop precision movements, and won five straight (1950-1954) Neuchatel Observatory prizes with their Caliber 135. In total, Zenith has won over 2,300 prizes for chronometry.

Today, while very few Zenith timepieces feature COSC certification (required to display the word "Chronometer" on the dial), the wristwatches meet or exceed these rigorous timekeeping standards, a reflection Zenith's history of precision timekeeping.

Collections 
Currently, Zenith has the following collections:

 Defy ("the future of tradition")
 Chronomaster ("an icon worn on the wrist")
 Elite ("timeless elegance by Zenith")
 Pilot ("heading for far horizons")
Previous collections include:

 Academy
 Class
 Captain
 De Luca (1988-1996) - Automatic chronograph
 Port Royal
 Rainbow (1992-1999) - Automatic chronograph. Named for a William Starling Burgess Design J Class sailboat that won the 1934 America's Cup. 
 Sporto
 Stellina

Movements

El Primero
The El Primero calibre, when it was first unveiled on January 10, 1969, it was the first high frequency automatic chronograph movement,   and  certainly the one to put Zenith Watches on the map. One of the original watchmakers who worked on the movement, Charles Vermot took upon himself to save the brilliant calibre when the owners of the brand decided to abandon the idea of a mechanical chronograph and focus on Quartz timepieces in 1975. While all the tools, components etc. used to manufacture the calibre were being dumped or sold, Vermot gathered all the necessary technical plans and tools and hid them in a walled-off attic at the Zenith manufacture to protect the El Primero for future generations. 

A decade later, when it was resurrected in 1986. the same tools, plans and components helped start the production of the El Primero again.

It was one of the first automatic chronograph movements and has a frequency of 36,000 vibrations per hour (5 Hz). Zenith's El Primero movement was used by Rolex from 1988 to 2000 for the Rolex Daytona chronograph. The El Primero was honoured with a 2012 release of the El Primero Stratos Flyback Striking 10th, limited to 1,969 pieces (in honour of the original 1969 release date), that housed the same 36,000 vph movement and a sub-dial measuring in tenths of a second to make a complete rotation every ten seconds.

Elite 
In 1991, Zenith began development of a modular, slim, adaptable, and multipurpose in-house movement that could be housed within a wide variety of timepieces across their various collections. Lead by technical director Jean-Pierre Gerber, and aided by the manufacturer's first utilization of CAD, they developed an ultra-thin movement that ranged from 2.83mm to 6.20mm of thickness, depending on the inclusion of complications. Operating at 28,800 vibrations per hour (4 Hz), and featuring an annual Glucydur balance wheel, a self-compensating balance spring, and an automatic winding system with a large diameter tungsten carbide rotor mounted on ball bearings, the movement was designed for precision timekeeping that required minimal maintenance. When introduced at BaselWorld in 1994, it was awarded the title of "Best Movement of the Year".

Under Jean-Frederic Dufour tenure as CEO, the company decided to replace the Elite movement in their entry-level wristwatches with a more economical Sellita movement, and further develop a double-barrel version of the Elite for higher-end models. Upon Dufour's departure to Rolex in 2014, incoming CEO Aldo Magada reversed this decision, and the Elite is still being built by the company today.

The first wristwatches to include the movement were released in a similarly named Elite collection, which remain a feature of the present-day collection. Additionally, the movement has been a feature of the Defy collection.

Chief Executive Officer 
The current CEO (and President) of Zenith is Julien Tornare, who was named into the role in April 2017. Prior to joining Zenith, he was the Managing-Director for Asia-Pacific at Vacheron Constantin, a company he was a part of for 17 years. Mr. Tornare grew up in Geneva, Switzerland, and while he was surrounded by some of the greatest names in watchmaking, he didn't gain an appreciation for watches until he joined Raymond Weil at the age of 25. Mr. Tornare is currently married and has three children.

Previous CEOs 

 Jean-Claude Biver (LVMH) - January 2017 to April 2017
 Aldo Magada (LVMH) - July 2014 to January 2017
 Jean-Frédéric Dufour (LVMH) - June 2009 to April 2014
 Theirry Nataf (LVMH) - October 2001 - April 2009
 François Manfredini (LVMH) - November 1999 - October 2001
 Paul Castella (Dixi) - 1978-1999

Photo gallery

Notable patrons and owners 
Mahatma Gandhi owned a Zenith pocket watch with alarm function, which was given to him by Indira Gandhi, the 3rd Prime Minister of India. On March 5, 2009, the pocket watch along with some of Gandhi's other personal belongings were auctioned by Antiquorum in New York, altogether fetching US$2,096,000. The leader of the Kurdistan Workers' Party (PKK) Abdullah Öcalan had a Zenith watch when he was detained by the Turkish authorities.

See also
 List of watch manufacturers
 Manufacture d'horlogerie

References

External links

 Zenith official website

Manufacturing companies established in 1865
LVMH brands
Swiss watch brands
Watch manufacturing companies of Switzerland
Le Locle
Luxury brands
Companies based in the canton of Neuchâtel
Swiss companies established in 1865
1999 mergers and acquisitions